Clathrodrillia walteri is a species of sea snail, a marine gastropod mollusk in the family Drilliidae.

Description
The shell grows to a length of  38 mm.

Distribution
This species occurs in the Pacific Ocean off Pearl Islands, Panama

References

External links
 

walteri
Gastropods described in 1946